Naag Nagin  is a 1990 Bollywood film directed by Ramkumar Bohra and starring Rajiv Kapoor, Mandakini, Raza Murad and Vijayta Pandit.

Soundtrack
"Aa Mere Pyar Meri Zindagi Mein Aa" - Shabbir Kumar, Anuradha Paudwal
"Bhagwan Tujhe Aana Hi Padega" - Anuradha Paudwal
"Mehfil Mein Mujhko Dekh Kar Tumne" - Anupama Deshpande
"Naag Nagin" (Music)
"Tu Naag Main Nagin" - Kavita Krishnamurthy, Nitin Mukesh
"Tu Naag Main Nagin v2" - Kavita Krishnamurthy, Nitin Mukesh
"Tu Naag Main Nagin v3" - Kavita Krishnamurthy, Nitin Mukesh
"Tu Naag Main Nagin v4" - Kavita Krishnamurthy, Nitin Mukesh
"Tu Naag Main Nagin v5" - Kavita Krishnamurthy, Nitin Mukesh
"Tu Naag Main Nagin v6" - Kavita Krishnamurthy, Nitin Mukesh

References

1980s Hindi-language films
1989 films
Films scored by Laxmikant–Pyarelal
Films about snakes
Films about shapeshifting